Ectropina suttoni is a moth of the family Gracillariidae. It is known from Nigeria.

References

Endemic fauna of Nigeria
Gracillariinae
Insects of West Africa
Moths of Africa
Moths described in 1980